is a platform game released in arcades in 1987. A Nintendo Entertainment System port followed. Players take control of the title character Jinborov Karnovski, or "Karnov" for short. Karnov is a strongman popularly illustrated as being from an unspecified part of the Soviet Union's Central Asian republics as shown on the arcade flyer and again in Karnov's Revenge.

As a character created by Data East, Karnov was reintroduced in several other games from the company, including Bad Dudes Vs. DragonNinja in which he is a boss in the first level. Karnov later appeared in the 1994 Neo-Geo game Karnov's Revenge. This game, also known as Fighter's History Dynamite, is not a sequel to the original Karnov, but to Fighter's History, a one-on-one fighter in which Karnov is the final boss.

Gameplay
The game puts the bulging-muscled, fire-breathing, east-Russian, ex-circus strongman hero on a quest through nine different levels to search for the ultimate treasure. However, between him and the treasure are several horrendous monsters, including sword-wielding monks, dinosaurs, djinn, hopping fish men, gargoyles, tree monsters, will-o-wisps, rock creatures, centipede women, and ostrich-riding skeleton warriors.

Karnov can walk, jump, and shoot to make his way through these levels and find special items that help him. Acquiring red orbs can upgrade Karnov until he shoots three fireballs at a time. The end of each level has one or more bosses which he must defeat to receive a new piece of a treasure map. The end of the game features a powerful boss called "The Wizard" who defends the last map piece that leads to the treasure.

Ports
Karnov  was later ported to numerous home systems, such as the NES, Commodore 64, ZX Spectrum and others.

IBM PC
The IBM PC compatibles port was developed by Quicksilver Software. Like Quicksilver's other Data East ports, such as Commando, Ikari Warriors, and Guerrilla War, it was sold as a self-booting disk.

Famicom/NES
The Famicom version was co-developed by Data East (design and audio) and SAS Sakata (programming). It was released on December 18, 1987 in Japan by Namco, and shortly thereafter on its North American equivalent, the NES, in 1988 by Data East itself. Although it plays very similarly to the arcade game there are some noticeable differences:

 Karnov takes two hits to die instead of just one. After being hit once he will turn a blue color in which he has one hit left or can gain an extra hit back by grabbing a blue fireball orb.
 The Super Fireball is replaced with the Spike Bomb which destroys every enemy on screen. The Trolley item is replaced with the Shield which is used to reflect an enemy's fireballs.
 Levels 4 and 8 are completely different from the arcade levels.
 The final boss is no longer the Wizard, but a giant three-headed dragon. Both fights, however, take place in similar rooms.

The Famicom game is noticeably more difficult since it has limited continues, and the option is not visibly present after all lives are lost, instead requiring pressing Select and Start at the same time. The NES game, however, provides unlimited continues, and it also allows Karnov to be killed when both the A and B buttons are pressed on the second controller.

Reception

In Japan, Game Machine listed Karnov on their March 1, 1987 issue as being the fourth most-successful table arcade unit of the month. Karnovs sales had surpassed 250,000 copies by November 1989.

Bill Kunkel reviewed the game for Computer Gaming World, calling it an off-beat variation on a familiar videogame play mechanic.

The IBM PC version of the game was reviewed in 1989 in Dragon #142 by Hartley, Patricia, and Kirk Lesser in "The Role of Computers" column. The reviewers gave the game 4½ out of 5 stars.

Legacy
Although no direct sequel to Karnov was released, Data East has used the title character as an enemy. In some games, such as Garyo Retsuden, Tumblepop and Trio The Punch - Never Forget Me... (featuring enormous stone statues and even mini versions of the character), Karnov is featured as a regular enemy.

In other Data East games, he is featured as a boss character. In Bad Dudes Vs. DragonNinja, Karnov is the first level's boss. A pale grey version of Karnov appears later in the game. According to the credits sequence of the Japanese version of the game, this version of Karnov is called Kusamochi Karnov, after the green sweet kusamochi.

Karnov is also the last opponent in the original Fighter's History, and becomes a playable character in its sequels: Karnov's Revenge and Fighter's History: Mizoguchi Kiki Ippatsu!!. Although not an official cameo, the guard boss from the Gaelco game, Big Karnak, is almost identical to Karnov's and Kusamoci Karnov's sprites from Bad Dudes vs. DragonNinja.

Karnov has also made various cameo appearances. He appears in the alley background of the Neo-Geo game Street Slam. He is shown wearing a shirt with a "K" on it. Karnov also appears in the credits of the independently-developed freeware game I Wanna Be the Guy. In Shantae and the Pirate's Curse, a ghostly silhouette who helps the titular character is highly similar to Karnov, and is even implied to be her dead father.

See also
 Chelnov
 Karnov's Revenge
 Fighter's History characters

References

External links
 
 
 Arcade-History.com entry
 

1987 video games
Amstrad CPC games
Arcade video games
Commodore 64 games
Data East video games
Classic Mac OS games
Namco games
Nintendo Entertainment System games
Platform games
Tiger Electronics handheld games
ZX Spectrum games
Video game characters with fire or heat abilities
Video games developed in Japan
Multiplayer and single-player video games
Data East arcade games
Fictional Russian people in video games
Quicksilver Software games